Celtic Pride is a 1996 American sports comedy film written by Judd Apatow and Colin Quinn, and directed by Tom DeCerchio. It stars Daniel Stern and Dan Aykroyd as Mike O'Hara and Jimmy Flaherty, two passionate Boston Celtics fans, and Damon Wayans as Lewis Scott, the Utah Jazz's All-Star shooting guard.

Plot
Best friends for life, physical education teacher Mike O'Hara and plumber Jimmy Flaherty are united by their love of Boston and its sports teams, especially the Boston Celtics, who are playing their last season in the old Boston Garden. When the Celtics drop Game 6 of the NBA Finals to the Utah Jazz, setting up a deciding Game 7 in Boston, Mike and Jimmy find themselves depressed and hopeless. On top of all this, Mike has moved back in with Jimmy after his wife Carol, fed up with his unhealthy obsession with the Celtics, left him and took their son Tommy with her. Jimmy and Mike stumble upon the Jazz's selfish, arrogant shooting guard Lewis Scott at a Boston nightclub. Hoping at first to get him so drunk that he will be hungover for Game 7, Mike and Jimmy pose as Utah fans. However, the pair get more than they bargained for when the next morning they end up kidnapping Scott after he wakes up at Jimmy's apartment. The two decide to hold Scott until after the game, reasoning that if they are going to prison, they might as well help the Celtics win in the meantime.

Scott derides them for being washed-up losers, and insinuates Mike is only after him because he is jealous of Scott's fame and ability. Mike, on the other hand, berates Scott for his behavior on and off the court, including starring in a campy Oscar Mayer hot dog commercial and skipping practices. Scott attempts to turn Jimmy against Mike, and, when this fails, escapes, only to be foiled by an antagonistic cabbie and a local cop, Kevin, both fellow Celtics fans.  
   
Ultimately, Mike challenges Scott to a game of one-on-one and the pair is incapacitated well before the final game is set to begin. Before he runs off, Scott presents the pair with a dilemma: they must root for him and the Jazz to win, or he will turn them both in to the police. Mike reconciles with his wife and son, knowing he might be going to prison, and Jimmy says goodbye to his grandmother. At the game, the two convince the other Celtics fans they are only pretending to root for the Jazz to jinx them, and the first half ends with the Celtics leading. Mike, who knows the Jazz are losing because Scott refuses to pass the ball, gives him a pep talk from the stands, and Utah closes the gap to one point with a little over 7 seconds remaining. With one play left and the Jazz with the ball, Mike and Jimmy choose life over the Celtics, rooting for Utah and rushing the court after they win. Approached by Kevin, who earlier ignored his cries for help, Lewis denies Mike and Jimmy committed the kidnapping, saving them from prison.

A few months later, Mike has promised his wife he would never interfere with an NBA Finals game again. When football season begins, however, he and Jimmy sneak into Deion Sanders' hotel room at 3:00 a.m., presumably to kidnap him.

Cast
 Daniel Stern as Mike O'Hara 
 Dan Aykroyd as Jimmy Flaherty 
 Damon Wayans as Lewis Scott
 Gail O'Grady as Carol O'Hara
 Christopher McDonald as Coach Kimball
 Paul Guilfoyle as Kevin O'Grady
 Adam Hendershott as Tommy O'Hara
 Scott Lawrence as Ted Hennison
 Vladimir Cuk as Lurch
 Deion Sanders as himself
 Bill Walton as himself
 Darrell Hammond as Chris McCarthy
 Larry Bird as himself
 Marv Albert as himself
 Bob Cousy as himself

Reception
The film was not a major success despite its star power, grossing less than $10 million domestically. The film received negative reviews. On Rotten Tomatoes it has an approval rating of 8% based on reviews from 24 critics. Audiences surveyed by CinemaScore gave the film a grade of B− on a scale of A to F.

Hal Hinson of The Washington Post wrote, "Celtic Pride is clearly intended as a spoof on the contemporary mania for athletics. But not only is the picture woefully short on laughs, it's also coarse, overbearing and, in places, downright insulting". TV Guide said "Celtic Pride supplies predictably lowbrow yocks for jocks, and its rather disturbing racial implications go entirely unacknowledged," and awarded it 1 and half stars out of five.

In a positive review, Joe Leydon of Variety said "Not quite a three-pointer, but definitely more than an airball, Celtic Pride is an uneven but largely likable basketball-themed comedy that should lay up decent B.O. numbers and perform even better in the homevid arena."

References

External links
 
 
 

1990s buddy comedy films
1990s sports comedy films
1996 directorial debut films
1996 films
Hollywood Pictures films
Caravan Pictures films
American basketball films
American buddy comedy films
Boston Celtics
Utah Jazz
Films set in Boston
1990s English-language films
American sports comedy films
Films with screenplays by Judd Apatow
Films scored by Basil Poledouris
Films produced by Roger Birnbaum
Films produced by Judd Apatow
Films about kidnapping
1996 comedy films
1990s American films
Films about National Basketball Association